Severoiztochen Planning Region (Northeast Planning Region) is a planning region in Bulgaria.The region includes four provinces: Targovishte Province, Varna Province, Shumen Province and Dobrich Province.

Largest cities are Varna (360,000 - city proper; 500,000 - metro area), Dobrich (105,000 - city; 115,000 - agglomeration), Shumen (95,000), Silistra (42,000 -city; 52,000 - agglomeration). The agglomeration of Varna includes the towns of Provadia (14,000), Devnya (10,000), Aksakovo (7600 - fastest growing town in area) and others. The agglomeration of Silistra includes the largest villages in Bulgaria - Aydemir (7800) and Kalipetrovo (4700).

It is bordered on the east by the Black Sea. The Kamchia river flows through the region.

Economy
One of richest regions of Bulgaria, Severoiztochen is important for the national economy. Its economy is service-oriented and includes tourism. Severoiztochen is the second region most-visited region by foreign tourists after Yugoiztochen. Notable resorts include Golden Sands, Albena, SS Constantine and Helena. Interesting places are the towns of Balchik, Kavarna, Cape Kaliakra - on the sea, Madara - nearby Shumen, Srebarna Nature Reserve - nearby Silistra; Shumen boasts the Monument to 1300 Years of Bulgaria. Silistra Province and Dobrich Province form Southern Dobruja - the Bulgarian breadbasket. The port of Varna is the largest port in Bulgaria and the third largest on the Black Sea. The port of Balchik is a small fishing town. On the Danube, important ports are Silistra - fourth largest on the river, and Tutrakan. Varna is Bulgaria's second financial capital after Sofia; the city produces electronics, ships, food and other goods. Other important industrial centers in the region are Shumen - production and repair of trucks; Dobrich - big food-producing city, unofficial capital of Dobruja; Silistra - electronics, food; Devnya - big chemical center (cement and nitric fertilizer); Tutrakan - food and fishing boat.

See also 
 NUTS of Bulgaria

References

Regions of Bulgaria